Allium tuberosum (garlic chives, Oriental garlic, Asian chives, Chinese chives, Chinese leek) is a species of plant native to the Chinese province of Shanxi, and cultivated and naturalized elsewhere in Asia and around the world.

Description 
It grows in slowly expanding perennial clumps, but also readily sprouts from seed. In warmer areas (USDA zone 8 and warmer), garlic chives may remain green all year round. In cold areas (USDA zones 7 to 4b), leaves and stalks completely die back to the ground, and resprout from roots or rhizomes in the spring.

The flavor is more like garlic than chives.

Taxonomy 
Originally described by Johan Peter Rottler, the species name was validly published by Curt Polycarp Joachim Sprengel in 1825. A. tuberosum is classified within Allium in subgenus Butomissa (Salisb.) N. Friesen, section Butomissa (Salisb.) Kamelin, a group consisting of only A. tuberosum and A. ramosum L., which have been variously regarded as either one or two genetic entities.

Distribution and habitat 
Allium tuberosum originated in the Siberian–Mongolian–North Chinese steppes, but is widely cultivated and naturalised. It has been reported as growing wild in scattered locations in the United States (Illinois, Michigan, Ohio, Nebraska, Alabama, Iowa, Arkansas, and Wisconsin). However, it is believed to be more widespread in North America because of the availability of seeds and seedlings of this species as an exotic herb and because of its high aggressiveness. This species is also widespread across much of mainland Europe and invasive in other areas of the world.

Ecology 
A late summer- to autumn-blooming plant, A. tuberosum is one of several Allium species known as wild onion and/or wild garlic that, in various parts of the world, such as Australia, are listed as noxious weeds or as invasive "serious high impact environmental and/or agricultural weeds that spread rapidly and often create monocultures".

Cultivation 
Often grown as an ornamental plant in gardens, several cultivars are available. A. tuberosum is distinctive by blooming later than most native or naturalised species of Allium. It is cold-hardy to USDA zones 4–10. Garlic chives are regarded as easy to grow in many conditions and may spread readily by seeds or can be intentionally propagated by dividing their clumps.

A number of varieties have been developed for either improved leaf (e.g. 'Shiva') or flower stem (e.g. 'Nien Hua') production. While the emphasis in Asia has been primarily culinary, in North America, the interest has been more as an ornamental. 'Monstrosum' is a giant ornamental cultivar.

Uses 

Uses have included as ornamental plants, including cut and dried flowers, culinary herbs, and  Garlic chives have been widely cultivated for centuries in East Asia for their culinary value. The flat leaves, the stalks, and immature, unopened flower buds are used as flavouring. Another form is "blanched" by regrowing after cutting under cover to produce white-yellow leaves and a subtler flavor.

China 
The leaves are used as a flavoring in a similar way to chives, scallions as a stir fry ingredient. In China, they are often used to make dumplings with eggs, shrimp, and/or pork. A Chinese flatbread similar to the scallion pancake may be made with garlic chives instead of scallions. Garlic chives are also one of the main ingredients used with yi mein dishes. Its flowers are fermented to make garlic chive flower sauce (韭花酱). When grown in dark environments, it is known as jiuhuang (韭黄) and is used in various stir fry dishes.

India
In Manipur and other northeastern states of India, it is grown and used as a substitute for garlic and onion in cooking and is known as maroi nakuppi in Manipuri.

Japan 
In Japan, where the plant is known as nira, it is used for both garlic and sweet flavors, in miso soups and salads, stir-fries with eggs, and Japanese dishes such as gyōza dumplings and fried liver.

Central Asia 
In Central Asian countries such as Kazakhstan and Kyrgyzstan, where the plant has been introduced through cultivation by Dungan farmers and ties with neighboring China, garlic chives are known by transliterations of their name. Used in cooking, it is sometimes added as a filling to manty, samsa, laghman, yuta, ashlan-fu, and other typical dishes.

Korea 
Known as buchu, garlic chives are widely used in Korean cuisine. They can be eaten fresh as namul, pickled as kimchi and jangajji, and pan-fried in buchimgae (pancake). they are also one of the most common herbs served with gukbap (soup with rice), as well as a common ingredient in mandu (dumplings).

Nepal 
In Nepal, cooks fry a curried vegetable dish of potatoes and A. tuberosum known as dunduko sag.

Vietnam
In Vietnam, the leaves of garlic chives, known as hẹ, are cut up into short pieces and used as the only vegetable in a broth with sliced pork kidneys.

Gallery

References

Bibliography

Books and monographs

Articles and chapters 
 
 
 
 
  in 
 , in

Websites 
 
 
 
 
 
 
 Allium tuberosum Rottl. ex Spreng. Medicinal Plant Images Database (School of Chinese Medicine, Hong Kong Baptist University)

External links 
 
 
 

tuberosum
Asian vegetables
Herbs
Flora of temperate Asia
Plants described in 1825